Ryan Alan Hade (c. 1982 – June 9, 2005) was an American sexual assault victim from Tacoma, Washington.  On May 20, 1989, he was raped, mutilated, stabbed and left for dead in a vacant lot that was later turned into a Tacoma park named Ryan's Park. Earl Kenneth Shriner was convicted of the attack and sentenced to 131 years in prison.  Shriner had a long history of sexual assault charges spanning 25 years. The case has been cited as one of the catalysts for new US laws allowing indefinite confinement of sex offenders. Hade, who survived the attack by Shriner, died in a vehicular accident.

References
Crime Library
Man who survived assault as a boy dies in motorcycle wreck The Seattle Times, June 22, 2005.
 RCW 71.09
 Metro Parks Tacoma Ryan's Park

1982 births
2005 deaths
Road incident deaths in Washington (state)
Motorcycle road incident deaths
Violence against men in North America